Lake Mantasoa is a large lake created by the Mandraka Dam on the Mandraka River in the Analamanga region of Madagascar.
It has an extension of 2005 ha.

References

Mandraka
Analamanga